Lake Vizcacha (Laguna Vizcacha) is a lake in the Moquegua Region of Peru.

See also
List of lakes in Peru

References
INEI, Compendio Estadistica 2007, page 26

Vizcacha
Vizcacha